Molecular and Cellular Biochemistry is a peer-reviewed scientific journal covering research in cellular biology and biochemistry. It was a successor to the journal Enzymologia and was established in 1973 to make "it possible to extend the potentialities of the periodical".

Abstracting and indexing 
The journal is abstracted and indexed in:

According to the Journal Citation Reports, the journal had a 2011 impact factor of 2.057. It has a 2021 impact factor of 3.842 according to its website https://www.springer.com/journal/11010.

References

External links 
 

Publications established in 1973
Molecular and cellular biology journals
Springer Science+Business Media academic journals
English-language journals